CKQC-FM is a Canadian radio station, broadcasting at 107.1 FM in Abbotsford, British Columbia. Owned by Rogers Sports & Media, the station airs a country format branded as Country 107.1. CFVR was established in 1962 as a semi-satellite station of CHWK. It mostly simulcast CHWK but had its own morning show. The station was a network affiliate of CBC Radio until 1981.

References

External links
 Country 107.1
 
 

Abbotsford, British Columbia
Kqc
Kqc
Kqc
Radio stations established in 1962
1962 establishments in British Columbia